
Gmina Chodzież is a rural gmina (administrative district) in Chodzież County, Greater Poland Voivodeship, in west-central Poland. Its seat is the town of Chodzież, although the town is not part of the territory of the gmina.

Villages
Gmina Chodzież contains the villages and settlements of Cisze, Ciszewo, Drzązgowo, Jacewko, Kamionka, Kierzkowice, Konstantynowo, Krystynka, Milcz, Mirowo, Nietuszkowo, Oleśnica, Pietronki, Podanin, Rataje, Rudki, Słomki, Stróżewice, Stróżewko, Stróżewo, Strzelce, Strzelęcin, Studzieniec, Trojanka, Trzaskowice, Wymysław and Zacharzyn.

Neighbouring gminas
Gmina Chodzież is bordered by the town of Chodzież and by the gminas of Budzyń, Czarnków, Kaczory, Margonin, Miasteczko Krajeńskie, Szamocin and Ujście.

References
Polish official population figures 2006

Chodziez
Chodzież County